The 2002 Bali bombings occurred on 12 October 2002 in the tourist district of Kuta on the Indonesian island of Bali. The attack killed 202 people (including 88 Australians, 38 Indonesians, 23 Britons, and people of more than 20 other nationalities). A further 209 people were injured.

Various members of Jemaah Islamiyah, a violent Islamist group, were convicted in relation to the bombings, including three individuals who were sentenced to death. The attack involved the detonation of three bombs: a backpack-mounted device carried by a suicide bomber; a large car bomb, both of which were detonated in or near popular nightclubs in Kuta; and a third much smaller device detonated outside the United States consulate in Denpasar, causing only minor damage. An audio-cassette purportedly carrying a recorded voice message from Osama bin Laden stated that the Bali bombings were in direct retaliation for support of the United States' War on Terror and Australia's role in the liberation of East Timor.

On 9 November 2008, Amrozi bin Nurhasyim, Imam Samudra and Huda bin Abdul Haq were executed by firing squad on the island prison of Nusakambangan. On 9 March 2010, Dulmatin, nicknamed "the Genius"—believed to be responsible for setting off one of the Bali bombs with a mobile phone—was killed in a shoot-out with Indonesian police in Pamulang, South Tangerang.

Attack 

At 11:05 p.m. on 12 October 2002, a suicide bomber inside the nightclub Paddy's Pub (sometimes referred to as Paddy’s Irish Bar) detonated a bomb in his backpack, causing many patrons, with or without injuries, to immediately flee into the street. Twenty seconds later, a second and much more powerful car bomb hidden inside a white Mitsubishi van was detonated by another suicide bomber outside the Sari Club, a renowned open-air thatch-roof bar located opposite Paddy's Pub.

The bombing occurred during one of the busiest tourist periods of the year in Kuta Beach, driven in part by many Australian sporting teams making their annual end-of-season holiday.

Damage to the densely populated residential and commercial district was immense, destroying neighbouring buildings and shattering windows several blocks away. The car bomb explosion left a one metre deep crater.

The local Sanglah Hospital was ill-equipped to deal with the scale of the disaster and was overwhelmed with the number of injured, particularly burn victims. There were so many people injured by the explosion that some of the injured had to be placed in hotel pools near the explosion site to ease the pain of their burns. Many of the injured were forced to be flown extreme distances to Darwin and Perth for specialist burn treatment.

A comparatively small bomb detonated outside the U.S. consulate in Denpasar, which is thought to have exploded shortly before the two Kuta bombs, caused minor injuries to one person and property damage was minimal. It was reportedly packed with human excrement.

A report released in August 2005 by the United States-Indonesia Society (USINDO) described the events as follows:
The investigators were thus able to recreate the bombers activities. Amrozi, Idris and Ali Imron had simply walked into a dealership and purchased a new Yamaha motorbike, after asking how much they could re-sell it for if they returned it in a few days. Imron used the motorbike to plant the small bomb outside the U.S. Consulate. Idris then rode the motorbike as Imron drove two suicide bombers in the Mitsubishi to the nightclub district in Kuta. He stopped near the Sari Club, instructed one suicide bomber to put on his explosives vest and the other to arm the vehicle bomb. The first bomber headed to Paddy's Pub. Idris then left the second bomber, who had only learned to drive in a straight line, to drive the minivan the short distance to the Sari Club. Idris picked up Imron on the Yamaha and the duo headed back into Denpasar. Idris dialed the number of the Nokia to detonate the bomb at the Consulate. The two suicide bombers exploded their devices. Imron and Idris dropped the motorbike at a place where it eventually attracted the attention of the caretaker.

The final death toll was 202, mainly comprising Western tourists and holiday-makers in their 20s and 30s who were in or near Paddy's Pub or the Sari Club, but also including many Balinese Indonesians working or living nearby, or simply passing by. Hundreds more people suffered horrific burns and other injuries. The largest group among those killed were tourists from Australia with 88 fatalities. On 14 October, the United Nations Security Council passed Resolution 1438 condemning the attack as a threat to international peace and security.

Awards 
There were many acts of individual heroism.

Kusitino 'Kossy' Halemai, a Wallis and Futuna-born Australian citizen who was managing the Bounty Hotel in Kuta at the time of the attacks, sheltered survivors in the immediate aftermath of the blasts. He was singled out for praise with the award of the Medal of the Order of Australia (OAM) on 13 June 2005.

Husband and wife Richard and Gilana Poore, who organized a makeshift triage area in the Bounty Hotel's reception area, were both honored with an OAM.

James Parkinson, an emergency nurse, worked alongside Doctor Hogg from Wollongong in the Denpasar Sanglah Hospital running the trauma centre for the bombing victims. After he disappeared in Africa and Europe for three years, the Governor General's department finally tracked him down and awarded Parkinson the Medal of the Order of Australia in 2005.

Senior Constable Timothy Britten and Mr Richard Joyes of Western Australia were both awarded the Cross of Valour for their actions during the course of the day. The Cross of Valour is the highest civilian honor and is equivalent to the Victoria Cross for Australia which is the highest military honor.

The bomb 
The Mitsubishi L300 van bomb was initially thought to have consisted of C4, a military grade plastic explosive which is difficult to obtain. However, investigators discovered the bomb was made from potassium chlorate, aluminium powder, and sulfur. For the Sari club bomb with the L300 van, the terrorists assembled 12 plastic filing cabinets filled with explosives. Ninety-four RDX electric detonators were fitted to the TNT.
The large, high-temperature blast damage produced by this mixture was similar to a thermobaric explosive, although the bombers may not have known this.

Suspects 
The organization suspected of responsibility for the bombing was Jemaah Islamiyah, an Islamist group allegedly led by radical cleric Abu Bakar Bashir. A week after the blasts, Arab satellite channel Al-Jazeera put to air an audio-cassette purportedly carrying a recorded voice message from Osama Bin Laden saying that the Bali bombings were in retaliation for support of the United States' war on terror and Australia's role in the liberation of East Timor.
You will be killed just as you kill, and will be bombed just as you bomb. Expect more that will further distress you.
The recording did not however claim responsibility for the Bali attack. However, former FBI agent Ali Soufan confirmed in his book, The Black Banners, that al-Qaeda did in fact finance the attack. In addition, Hambali confessed that al-Qaeda had sent him US$30,000 to fund the bombings of the two nightclubs.

The Indonesian chief of police, General Da'i Bachtiar said that the bombing was the "worst act of terror in Indonesia's history".

Aris Munandar (aka Sheik Aris) is a Jemaah Islamiyah associate linked to Bashir. He is believed to have assisted the Bali bomber Amrozi in acquiring some of the explosives used in the Bali bombings. Philippine intelligence considers Munandar to be associated with Mohammad Abdullah Sughayer, a Saudi national Abu Sayyaf Group in southern Philippines. Munandar is still at large. A report by the United States-Indonesia Society describes the arrest of Amrozi and other suspects.
General Pastika ordered his men to make the arrest early the next morning, November. Amrozi was asleep in the rear of the house. According to Greg Barton's account, Amrozi did not attempt to escape, but laughed instead, later exclaiming, "Gosh, you guys are very clever, how did you find me?" Amrozi's mobile phone, a particularly important piece of evidence, was seized during his arrest. Bags of chemical ingredients for bombs were found in his workshop and soil samples taken from outside his home showed traces of the primary chemical used in the Sari Club bomb. Police found receipts for the purchase of chemicals used to make the bombs, as well as a list of expenses incurred in making the bombs. Further search of Amrozi's home revealed copies of speeches by Osama bin Laden, and Abu Bakar Bashir, the radical Indonesian Muslim cleric reputed to be the leader of Jemaah Islamiyah. The speeches exhorted listeners to wage jihad. Police also uncovered training manuals on ambush techniques and numerous articles on jihad. Under questioning Amrozi revealed the names of six others involved in the bombing: Ali Imron, Imam Samudra, Dul Matin, Idris, Abdul Ghani and Umar Patek. But Amrozi's mobile phone proved to be the real catch. Indonesian investigators were able to print out a list of calls he had made immediately before, during and after the bombing, as well as the names and telephone numbers in the phone's memory. Pastika kept Amrozi's arrest secret for two days. After it was announced, Polri monitored the sudden flurry of communications among numbers listed in Amrozi's telephone before the calls abruptly ceased. The investigators were able to identify the location of a number of the telephones, leading to a series of arrests.

Indonesian authorities also believe more suspects remain at large. In 2005, Indonesian police arrested 24 additional people suspected of involvement in the Bali attacks and a 2003 bombing of the Marriott Hotel in Jakarta.

On 12 October 2005, a story in Australian broadcaster SBS's documentary series Dateline, called "Inside Indonesia's War on Terrorism", argued that the Indonesian military or police may have been involved in executing the attack.

On 13 June 2007, it was reported that Abu Dujana, who might have headed a terrorist cell in Bali, was captured.

Just past midnight on 9 November 2008, the three convicted of carrying out the bombings (Imam Samudra, Amrozi Nurhasyim, and Ali Ghufron) were executed by a firing squad.

Umar Patek was finally arrested in Abbottabad, Pakistan in early 2011. The U.S. government had offered a US$1 million reward for his arrest. Patek is a suspect in other bombings as well as the one in Bali.

Another suspect named Zulkarnaen was finally arrested in Lampung on 10 December 2020. He was also stated to have orchestrated numerous Jemaah Islamiyah-related incidents in the past and been one of the executives of said terrorist group.

Legal proceedings

Initial charges and trials 
In April 2003, Indonesian authorities charged Abu Bakar Bashir (also rendered "Ba'asyir"), the alleged spiritual leader of Jemaah Islamiyah, with treason. It was alleged that he tried to overthrow the government and establish an Islamic state. The specific charges against Bashir related to a series of church bombings on Christmas Eve in 2000, and to a plot to bomb United States and other Western interests in Singapore. He was initially not charged over the Bali attack, although he was frequently accused of being the instigator or inspirer of the attack. On 2 September, Bashir was acquitted of treason but convicted of lesser charges and sentenced to a prison term of four years. He said he would appeal. On 15 October 2004, he was arrested by the Indonesian authorities and charged with involvement in another bomb attack, which killed 14 people at the J. W. Marriott hotel in Jakarta on 5 August 2003. Secondary charges in this indictment accused him of involvement in the Bali bombing, the first time he faced charges in relation to this attack. On 3 March 2005, Bashir was found not guilty of the charges surrounding the 2003 bombing, but guilty of conspiracy over the 2002 attacks in Bali. He was sentenced to two and a half years imprisonment. The Australian, US, and many governments expressed its disappointment that the sentence was too short; in the outcome, Bashir was freed 14 June 2006 having served less than 26 months for his conspiracy, and on 21 December 2006, Bashir's conviction was overturned by Indonesia's Supreme Court.

On 30 April 2003, the first charges related to the Bali bombings were made against Amrozi bin Haji Nurhasyim, known as Amrozi, for allegedly buying the explosives and the van used in the bombings. On 8 August, he was found guilty and sentenced to death. Another participant in the bombing, Imam Samudra, was sentenced to death on 10 September. Amrozi's brother, Ali Imron, who had expressed remorse for his part in the bombing, was sentenced to life imprisonment on 18 September. A fourth accused, Ali Ghufron, the brother-in-law of Noordin Mohammed Top was sentenced to death on 1 October. Ali Ghufron, alias Mukhlas, told police that he was the head of one of Jemaah Islamiyah's four cells and had ordered the Bali bombings. He also confessed that a fellow leader Riduan Isamuddin, known as Hambali, had provided the funds for the attacks. He told police, I do not know for sure the source of the aforementioned money from Hambali; most probably it was from Afghanistan, that is, from Sheikh Usama bin Laden. As far as I know, Hambali did not have a source of funds except from Afghanistan. Another operative, Wan Min bin Wan Mat, revealed to police that he had given Mukhlas money, at Hambali's request and that he understood part of the money had come directly from al-Qaeda.

As noted below, all three were executed on 9 November 2008.
The Australian, US, and many other foreign governments expressed satisfaction with the speed and efficiency with which the Indonesian police and courts dealt with the bombings primary suspects, despite what they characterized as light sentences. All Australian jurisdictions abolished the death penalty more than 30 years ago, but a poll showed that 77% of Australians approved of the death sentence for Amrozi. The Australian government said it would not ask Indonesia to refrain from using the death penalty.

On 15 August, Riduan Isamuddin, generally known as Hambali, described as the operational chief of Jemaah Islamiyah was arrested in Ayutthaya, Thailand, the old capital one hour's drive north of Bangkok. He is in American custody in the Guantanamo Bay detention camp.

Constitutional appeals 
On 23 July 2004, one of the convicted bombers, Maskur Abdul Kadir, successfully appealed his conviction. He had been tried under retroactive laws which were introduced after the bombing and which were employed to aid the prosecution of those involved in the attack. These laws were used by the prosecution instead of existing criminal laws as they allowed the death penalty to be imposed and lowered certain evidentiary restrictions.

The highest court in Indonesia, the Constitutional Court, found by a margin of five to four that trying the terrorist suspects under these retroactive laws violated Article 28I(1) of the constitution [2]. The minority judges argued that international human rights documents such as the International Covenant on Civil and Political Rights allowed an exception to not applying retrospective legislation in the prosecution of crimes against humanity. The majority found that this argument was inconsistent with the text of Article 28I(1) which states that the rights listed there "cannot be limited under any circumstances."

Following this decision, charges related to the bombings against Idris, who had confessed to participating in the attacks to the police and court, were dismissed. The legal status of Kadir, Idris and others who might have their convictions quashed following the ruling on the retrospective law is unclear.

The Constitutional Court is a relatively new body, created after the fall of Suharto, and this decision was one of the first to overrule the constitutionality of the government's application of a law.

Execution of perpetrators 
On 24 October 2008, Bali officials announced that three men convicted of carrying out the bombings would be executed by firing squad in November 2008. On 25 October 2008, Communications and Information Minister asked the Indonesian media to stop calling the three "heroes".

The Denpasar District Court, on 3 November, accepted a reprieve motion to reconsider the death sentences. Fahmi Bachmid, a lawyer for the family of Jafar Sodiq, a brother of Amrozi and Mukhlas, stated: "We lodged the judicial review to Denpasar court to question (previous) decisions." Lawyer Imam Asmara Hadi stated: "We have lodged an appeal because we haven't received a copy of the Supreme Court rejection of our previous appeal."

Indonesia's Supreme Court denied previous petitions for judicial review amid the constitutional court's dismissal of the bombers' appeals. Denpasar court official Nengah Sanjaya said the 3-page appeal would be sent to a Cilacap, central Java court. But the Attorney General's office said on 1 November the execution was "very close." Supreme Court judge Djoko Sarwoko, however, said a "last-minute legal challenge by the relatives of Imam Samudra, Amrozi Nurhasyim and Ali Ghufron will not change or delay the execution." They were moved to isolation cells, and execution spots were ready on the Nusakambangan island prison where they were being held. Local chief prosecutor Muhammad Yamin said they would be "executed simultaneously" but at different locations.

Imam Samudra, Amrozi Nurhasyim and Ali Ghufron were executed by firing squad after midnight on 9 November 2008 (West Indonesian time). In the final moment, there was no remorse or repentance, and they shouted: Allahu Akbar, or "God is great!" Despite his carefree demeanor throughout his trial and incarceration, the Australian edition of The Daily Telegraph reported Amrozi was pale-faced and shaking in the moments before his execution. For burial, Mukhlas and Amrozi's bodies were flown by helicopter to Tenggulan, Lamongan, East Java, while Imam Samudra's body was flown to Serang, Banten, amid "welcome martyrs" banner displayed at the cemetery.

The execution caused high tension and sparked clashes in Tenggulan between hundreds of police and supporters. Indonesian singer and TV presenter Dorce Gamalama attended the funeral of Imam Samudra. After praying with the crowd, she spent half an hour in the house of the executed man and spoke with his mother. On leaving she was quoted as saying "I'm certain he's gone to heaven". Ma'ruf Amin, deputy chairman of the Indonesian Ulemas Council, the chief body for Islamic clerics in Indonesia said of the men: "They did not die a holy death. That can only be in a war and Indonesia is not at war."

Memorials

Bali 

A permanent memorial was built on the site of the destroyed Paddy's Pub on Legian Street. (A new bar, named "Paddy's: Reloaded", was reopened further along Legian Street). The memorial is made of intricately carved stone, set with a large marble plaque, which bears the names and nationalities of each of those killed. It is flanked by the national flags of the victims. The monument is well-maintained and illuminated at night.

The memorial was dedicated on 12 October 2004, the second anniversary of the attack. The dedication included a Balinese Hindu ceremony and the opportunity for mourners to lay flowers and other offerings. The Australian ambassador and Indonesian officials attended the ceremony.

The Balinese mark their commitment in a nine-day-long event. After major cleansing ceremonies, establishing a memorial for the lost lives, and paying respect to those who left loved ones behind, the people of Kuta look forward to restoring Bali's image through an event named "Kuta Karnival — A Celebration of Life". The community event consists of traditional art performances such as Balinese Sunset Dances, sports on the beach as well as in the water for young and old plus rows and rows of culinary displays along the one kilometre of sandy beach.

In line with the return of tourism to Kuta, Kuta Karnival has grown into a tourism promotional event with major coverage from television and newspapers from across the globe. Companies, embassies, Non-Government Organizations, associations and even individuals come forth to get involved in the various events such as a Balinese dance competition presented by a surf-wear company, an environment exhibition presented by an embassy, a fun cycle presented by a group of individuals, a seminar presented by an association and a parade on the streets presented by an NGO. Tourists and locals alike, more than ninety thousand people participates in the numerous events, year after year.

A repeated tragedy in Bali in 2005 did not reduce the Kuta community's determination to carry out this annual event. Kuta Karnival is conducted to commemorate and give respect to the victims of human violence and show the world the true spirit of local community survival despite terrorism attacks.

On 12 October 2010, Australian and Indonesian survivors of the 2002 bombings attended a solemn commemoration service to mark the eighth anniversary of the devastating attacks.

Melbourne 

In Lincoln Square on the western side of Swanston Street in Carlton, Melbourne, is a memorial representing the 88 Australians who died in the bombings, and notably the 22 from Victoria.

There are 88 jets in the fountain; at night, there are lights representing all those who died. The fountain shuts off and becomes a reflecting pool on 12 October each year.

This was one of the very few fountains allowed to operate during the drought in 2007.

Christine Anu sang The Lighthouse by toxtwo at the opening ceremony.

Jason McCartney 

One Melburnian survivor of the bombings was North Melbourne AFL player Jason McCartney. He suffered second-degree burns to over 50% of his body while helping carry others to safety and nearly died during surgery after being transported back to Melbourne.

After a long rehabilitation process, McCartney returned for a single AFL match: North Melbourne vs. Richmond at Docklands Stadium in Melbourne on 6 June 2003. He wore compression garments and protective gloves as well as the numbers "88" and "202" on his jersey, signifying the Australian and total numbers of victims, while many in the crowd held up signs saying "Bali 88/202". Other Australian victims were honored in a video shown on the stadium's video screens before the game, with the attendees including Melbourne players Steven Febey and Steven Armstrong, who were both injured in the blast, and representatives from five Australian rules football clubs who lost players in the attacks were presented to the crowd. McCartney helped his team to a narrow win before announcing his retirement at the end of the game, and his comeback has been cited as one of the AFL's most inspirational stories.

Perth 

A memorial which lists the victims of the bombings from Western Australia was opened on the first anniversary, and is situated on the ridge of Mount Eliza in Kings Park, overlooking the city. The memorial is specifically designed to frame the sun's rays at dawn on 12 October each year and faces in the exact direction of Bali.

Gold Coast 
An Indonesian-style stone memorial is situated in Allambe Memorial Park at Nerang. A bronze plaque lists the names of the 88 Australians who died in the bombings. An annual twilight service is held at the site of the memorial on each anniversary of the Bali bombings.

Sydney 

On the northern side of Coogee Beach a memorial to the Bali bombing victims comprises three interlocking bronze shapes that have an abstract resemblance to three bowed figures supporting each other. There are also some graffiti memorials in memory of the dead.

A memorial to seven residents of Sutherland Shire who were victims is at Cronulla. Called The Seed, the work is based on the seed and foliage of the Banksia robur, a native plant indigenous to the Shire. This sculpture of pink sandstone is the centrepiece of the memorial. It is set in a black granite pond located in 'Peryman Place' not far from North Cronulla Beach, frequented by many of the seven victims and their families. Two plaques are set into the granite surrounding the pond. The plaques carry the victims' photos, names, and ages; and also details of the event, the design's symbolism, its dedication, and a poem written by the families of the victims. The work is by sculptor Chris Bennetts and Ishi Buki Sandstone Sculpture.

South of Sydney, in the town of Ulladulla, a large youth centre is being built as a memorial to Craig Dunn and Danny Lewis, two local victims of the bombings. Money is being raised through the Dunn & Lewis Youth Development Foundation.

Canberra 
A granite cube serves as a memorial in the Eastern Formal Gardens of Parliament House.

London 

On the fourth anniversary of the bombings the Prince of Wales and Duchess of Cornwall (now Charles III and Camilla, Queen Consort) unveiled a memorial in London, at the rear of the Foreign and Commonwealth Office Main Building, facing St. James's Park. The memorial consists of a 1.5-metre marble globe, to represent that people from 21 countries were killed, and has 202 doves carved into it. The names of all 202 victims are on a curved stone wall behind the globe. It is the work of the artist Gary Breeze and the sculptor Martin Cook.

Hong Kong 
In 2005, two marble wall placards were unveiled at Hong Kong Football Club in memory of the members of the club who were killed in the bombings.

Singapore 
Every year since 2002, the Rugby Section of the Singapore Cricket Club (the "SCC") has held a dawn memorial service on the Padang (the SCC's rugby field in central Singapore) on the anniversary of the bombings, to honour the memory of the eight players which the SCC lost (Neil Bowler, Chris Redman, Dave Kent, Peter Record, Tim Arnold, Chris Bradford, Chris Kays and Charlie Vanrenen). The service is attended by survivors of the 2002 rugby tour to Bali, friends and family of those who lost their lives, as well as current and past players of the club.

The SCC also maintains a permanent memorial to the players it lost inside the club's main lounge.

Vietnam 
A remembrance garden was constructed at the International School Ho Chi Minh City commemorating teachers from that school who were killed in the bombings.

In media 

In 2006, Long Road to Heaven, an Indonesian feature film about the bombings, was released by Kalyana Shira Films. The film was directed by Enison Sinaro and written by Wong Wai Leng and Andy Logam-Tan. It stars Raelee Hill, Mirrah Foulkes, Alex Komang, Surya Saputra, John O' Hare, Sarah Treleaven, and Joshua Pandelaki. It tells the story during three different times: the planning a few months before the bombing, its execution in 2002, and the trials in 2003 through the viewpoints of both the victims and the bombers. The story is not chronologically linear, starting with the explosion and then moving from time to time so as all three plots are culminated one after the other. At the beginning of each scene, subtitles tell the date and location of the scene.

A comic book about the first Bali bombing was launched to promote peace and discourage radicalism and terrorism in Indonesia. The book, Ketika Nurani Bicara (When Conscience Speaks), tells about the bombing from the perspective of three people: a volunteer who helped evacuate a bombing victim who lost her husband in the blast; a  victim who struggled to raise her children without her husband; and a terrorist who regrets his involvement in the bombing.

A Seconds from Disaster episode, "Bali Bombings", was a documentary telling the story of what happened, and looking at what happened after the incident.

A Zero Hour documentary depicts the disaster.

In 2022 (20 years after the incident), the Australian-Indonesian historical drama Bali 2002, aired on Stan and Nine Network.

See also 

 2005 Bali bombings
 Christmas Eve 2000 Indonesia bombings
 2004 Jakarta embassy bombing
 Anti-Australian sentiment
 Bali Mandara Eye Hospital
 List of terrorist incidents
 List of terrorist incidents in Indonesia
 Terrorism in Indonesia
 Traumascapes

References

External links
 Remember Bali: a memorial website
 Australian Broadcasting Corp. Online, current affairs program Four Corners: "The Bali Confessions" (10 February 2003)
 Bali's message of dialogue- includes the Bali Declaration on Building Interfaith Harmony July 2005
 Moruning in Bali: Bali is Wounded

 
2002 in Australia
2002 in Indonesia
2002 in international relations
Terrorist incidents in Indonesia in 2002
21st century in Bali
Attacks in Asia in 2002
Post-Suharto era
Bali, 2002
Islamic terrorist incidents in 2002
Improvised explosive device bombings in Indonesia
Bali, 2002
Bali, 2002
Bali 2002
Bali, 2002
Australia–Indonesia relations
Australian terrorism victims
Mass murder in 2002
Car and truck bombings in Indonesia
Australian people murdered abroad
Anti-Australian sentiment
Suicide bombings in 2002
Attacks on nightclubs
October 2002 crimes
October 2002 events in Asia
Attacks on tourists
Anti-Western sentiment
Building bombings in Indonesia
Anti-Americanism